Corniche is a type of a road running by a mountain side or by a headland.

Corniche (or The Corniche) may refer to the following places:

Corniche (Abu Dhabi) in the UAE
Corniche (Alexandria) in Alexandria, Egypt
Corniche Beirut in Beirut
Corniche des Crêtes in France
Dammam Corniche in Dammam
Doha Corniche in Doha
Dubai Corniche in Dubai, UAE
Jeddah Corniche in Jeddah, Saudi Arabia
Corniche Jjilienne in Algeria
 in Marseille, France
 in France
Shanghai Corniche in Shanghai, China
Sharjah Corniche in Sharjah, UAE
The Three Corniches on the Côte d'Azur, France:
Corniche Infèrieure (or Basse Corniche)
Moyenne Corniche
Grande Corniche
Marine Drive, Mumbai, in Mumbai (Bombay), India

It may also refer to:
Rolls-Royce Corniche, a series of automobiles made by Rolls-Royce from 1971 to 2002

In sports:
Corniche (horse), an American thoroughbred racehorse

See also
Cornice